Graeme Angus (born 17 May 1971) is an English cricketer who played for Northumberland County Cricket Club.  His highest score of 10 came when playing for Northumberland in the match against Nottinghamshire.   His best bowling of 2/25 came when playing for Northumberland in the match against Staffordshire.

He played 64 Minor Counties Championship games for Northumberland, and 20 games for Northumberland in the Minor Counties Trophy.

Also he played 4 games in the Second Eleven Championship.

References

English cricketers
Northumberland cricketers
Cricketers from Newcastle upon Tyne
Living people
1971 births